is a Japanese tokusatsu TV drama and the twelfth show in the Ultra Series. Produced by Tsuburaya Productions, Ultraman Tiga had aired at 6:00pm and aired between September 7, 1996 to August 30, 1997, with a total of 52 episodes with five movies (three being crossovers, two being direct sequels to the series as well as a comic book series).

It was broadcast after a franchise hiatus of over 15 years, set in a universe different from all previous series and updated with a new look and feel. Tiga is the first Ultraman with multiple combat modes and non-red colors. It is one of the most popular entries in the Ultra Series. Because of Tiga's popularity, he had more exposure on TV and movies than any other Heisei Ultraman. Ultraman Tiga was also dubbed in English by 4Kids Entertainment and broadcast in the United States as part of the FoxBox programming block on Fox Broadcasting Company affiliates, making it the fourth Ultra Series to air in the United States after Ultraman, Ultra Seven and Ultraman: Towards the Future.

Plot

Set in an alternate universe in the year 2007-2010 (2049 in the U.S. dub), giant monsters and conquering aliens start to appear, as was foretold by an apocalyptic prophecy about uncontrollable chaos over the Earth. Facing the threat, the TPC (Terrestrial Peaceable Consortium) is created along with its branch, GUTS (Global Unlimited Task Squad). Through a holographic message in a capsule found by researchers, the GUTS gets knowledge about a golden pyramid built by an ancient civilization. At the site, three statues of a race of giants who defended early human civilization on Earth about 30,000,000 years ago have been unearthed. GUTS finds the three ancient statues, but two of them are destroyed by the monsters Golza and Melba. The third one gains life from the spiritual energy of officer Daigo, a descendant of the ancient race. Daigo and the remaining statue merge into a single being, made of light. Shortly after defeating the two monsters, Daigo is revealed by the hologram of the prophecy that 30 million years in the past, a great evil that not even the giants could stop, destroyed the ancient civilization. Ultraman Tiga is a hero who protects the Earth. He accompanied the children throughout their childhood.

The same evil reappears in the finale of the series, the Ruler of Darkness Gatanothor, and his servants, Gijera and Zeiger. Gatanothor defeats Ultraman Tiga with ease, withstanding the Delcalium Light Stream and a modified version of the Zeperion Ray, both Tiga finishes and turns him back into a stone statue, but the light of humanity can turn him into Glitter Tiga, giving him the power to defeat Gatanothor and save the Earth. However, Tiga's victory came at a cost. Daigo was no longer able to become Tiga after the Sparklence disintegrated into dust after his final battle. It is revealed that Tiga, although no longer bound to Daigo, and its energy now remains in the hearts of all those who believe in Tiga, inner strength, and justice. Given the right conditions such as times of despair, the sparks will gather and the Tiga statue will be revitalized.

Episodes 

  / "The Prophecy"
  / "Monster in the Mine"
  / "The False Prophet"
  / "Spark of Evil"
  / "Munakata's Monster"
  / "The Dark Cloud"
  / "Alien Invasion"
  / "All Hallows Eve"
   / "Stranded"
  / "Afraid of the Park"
  / "Friend or Foe?"
  / "Mutant from the Sea"
  / "Attack of the Crow-Men"
  / "Nowhere to Hide"
  / "Revenge of Gazoto"
  / "The Monster Slayer Returns"
  / "Dark vs Light"
  / "Golza is Back!"
  / "The Power of Light (Part 1)"
  / "The Power of Light (Part 2)"
  / "The Show Must Go On!"
  / "The Fog"
  / "Prehistoric Danger"
  / "Toxic Terror"

Films
Ultraman Tiga & Ultraman Dyna: Warriors of the Star of Light
Ultraman Tiga, Ultraman Dyna, & Ultraman Gaia: The Decisive Battle in Hyperspace
Ultraman Tiga: The Final Odyssey (2000): The story is set two years after the final episode.
Ultraman Tiga Gaiden: Revival of the Ancient Giant (2001): A direct-to-video special set at prequel to TV series and set many years after the end of the series (Year 2038, 21 years after the events of Ultraman Dyna) In it, Daigo and Rena also have a son who is named Tsubasa.
Superior Ultraman 8 Brothers
Ultraman X The Movie: Here It Comes! Our Ultraman

Other appearances

Cast
 /: 
 : 
 /: 
 : 
 : 
 : 
 : 
 : 
 : 
 : 
 : 
 : 
 : 
 : 
 Ultraman Tiga (Voice): 
 Narrator, :

Guest cast
 : 
 : 
 : 
 : 
 : 
 : 
 : 
 : 
 : 
 :

English dub
An English dub of the series was produced by 4Kids Entertainment and recorded by their in-house dubbing studio, 4Kids Productions. The dub aired on the Fox Box, which was formerly the Fox Kids Children's block on Fox in the United States. The first episode premiered on September 14, 2002.

4Kids' adaptation served as a parody of the original Ultraman series' English adaptation produced by Peter Fernandez and, as such, made some significant changes. Such changes include producing a new theme song and soundtrack that replaced the originals. Storylines were altered to comply with Fox's Standards and Practices division and accommodate commercial breaks and broadcasting scheduling. Each episode was one or two minutes shorter than its Japanese counterpart. The dub included tongue-in-cheek dialogue, which changed the personalities for some characters such as Captain Iruma, who was changed from a smart, level-headed individual to an airhead. Additionally, Captain Iruma was referred to as a "sir" instead of a "ma'am".

Some monsters were given new sound effects, and the transformation sequence was altered altogether, showcasing all of Tiga's forms and emphasizing the change from Daigo to Tiga. Tiga's "Multi, Power, and Sky Types" are changed into "Omni, Power, and Speed Modes," respectively. The Sparklence was renamed the "Torch of Tiga", although the Region 1 DVD Release refers to it as the "Spark Lance" for the first DVD but afterwards, the translation becomes "Sparklence. His light techniques were called "Luminizers", and the Color Timer is referred to as the "Biotic Sensor."

Ultraman Tiga was removed from the FoxBox lineup on March 15, 2003, due to low ratings, with only 25 episodes of the 52-episode series having aired. 4Kids initially planned to relaunch the show in September, but decided to release the Japanese episodes on DVD instead. As a result, their dub is only viewable through recordings of the original broadcasts. Erica Schroeder (who voiced Rena) claimed that part of the reason for Ultraman Tiga's limited success in the U.S. was due to 4Kids' indecision whether to satirize the show or make it serious.

English voice cast
Wayne Grayson as Daigo Madoka
Erica Schroeder as Rena Yanase
Megan Hollingshead as Megumi Iruma
Jimmy Zoppi as Masami Horii
Andrew Paull as Tetsuo Shinjoh
Sebastian Arcelus as Jun Yazumi
David Moo
Dan Green
Mike Pollock
Corinne Orr
Michael Rosenbaum
Jason Samuels
Eric Stuart
Crispin Freeman
Kerry Butler
Daniel DeSanto
Scott McNeil
Rino Romano
Richard Yearwood
Norm Spencer
Shayne Dukevitch as Marnie Shinjoh
Adam West as Ultraman

Songs 
Opening theme
"TAKE ME HIGHER"
Lyrics and Composition: Jennifer Batten, Alberto Emilio Contini, Giancarlo Pasquini
Japanese Lyrics: 
Arrangement: 
String Arrangement: 
Choral Arrangement: 
Artist: V6
 "TAKE ME HIGHER" reached #1 of the Oricon Weekly Rankings Charts for the week of September 30, 1996, and became a Platinum Record. For Mill Creek Entertainment's DVD release of the series, the song is replaced with "Mezameyo, Ultraman Tiga," except for episodes 3 and 4, which retain TAKE ME HIGHER.
Ending Theme
"Brave Love, TIGA"
Producer: 
Lyrics: Sunplaza Nakano
Composition: 
Arrangement: 
Artist: 
Leader: Gorō Kishitani
Members: , Toshiaki Karasawa, Sunplaza Nakano, Masahiko Nishimura, Barbe-Q Wasada,  
Insert song
"The memory of the blue night"
Lyrics and composition: G.BROOKER.K.RED
Artist: Hitomi Sudo ( Japanese Columbia )
"ULTRAMAN LOVE FOR CHILDREN (Big band version instrumental)" 
Composition: Hino Yasumasa
"TAKE ME HIGHER (NEW ALBUM MIX)" 
Lyrics and composition: Jennifer Batten, Alberto Emilio Contini, Giancarlo Pasquini 
Japanese lyrics: Suzuki Tadashi 
Arrangement: Hoshino Akihiko
Artist: V6

Post–release

Adaptations
Dark Horse Comics published a manga-style series based on Ultraman Tiga in 2003–2004.

China ban
In September 2021, the series was removed from online streaming platforms in China. The removal triggered outcry from Chinese fans, trended on Sina Weibo, and began a hashtag which was viewed 84 million times. Global Times deduced that the series was banned due to "violent plots" that featured fight scenes and explosions. However, the show returned to all major Chinese streaming video websites on September 27 of that same year but in an edited version.

Home media
In July 2020, Shout! Factory announced to have struck a multi-year deal with Alliance Entertainment and Mill Creek Entertainment, with the blessings of Tsuburaya and Indigo, that granted them the exclusive SVOD and AVOD digital rights to the Ultra series and films (1,100 TV episodes and 20 films) acquired by Mill Creek the previous year. Ultraman Tiga, amongst other titles, will stream in the United States and Canada through Shout! Factory TV and Tokushoutsu. Mill Creek's DVD release of Ultraman Tiga is set for October 19, 2021.

References

External links

Official website of Tsuburaya Productions 
Ultraman Connection — Official website 
Official Ultraman channel at YouTube

 
1996 Japanese television series debuts
1997 Japanese television series endings
TBS Television (Japan) original programming
Mainichi Broadcasting System original programming
Ultra television series